Wessex FM was a local radio station for the Weymouth, Dorchester and Bridport areas of Dorset, originating from studios in Dorchester. It broadcast on 97.2 MHz in Weymouth and Dorchester (from the Bincombe Hill transmitter), and on 96.0 MHz in Bridport (from the Bridport transmitter).

History

Early days
A group of local radio enthusiasts had been campaigning to have an Independent Local Radio (ILR) station in Dorset for some time, and eventually the Radio Authority issued the licence early in 1993. This was probably one of the last totally independent commercial radio stations in the country.

Having found a suitable premises in the centre of Dorchester, studio construction began while Roger Kennedy started recruiting the on-air team and deciding on the programme format. Roger also suggested the station's on-air name - Wessex FM - and the original strapline - "From the Heart of Dorset".

The station went on the air at 10am on 4 September 1993, with several special guests including veteran presenter Tony Blackburn.

Wessex FM before its closure
Until its closure on 31 August 2020, it had a reach percentage of 42%.

Programming 
All of Wessex FM's programming was produced and broadcast from its Dorchester studios. Presenter-led programming aired from 6am – midnight on weekdays, 6am – 6pm on Saturdays and 8am – 4pm on Sundays. All other output was automated.

Closure 
Wessex FM was purchased by Bauer Media in 2019 along with other stations in the UKRD Group. On 27 May 2020 it was announced that Wessex FM will become Greatest Hits Radio from early September 2020.  The station went through a transitional period where its playlist was changed over to the 70s, 80s and 90s era and jingles changed to reflect the station playing "greatest hits". Wessex FM was finally rebranded to Greatest Hits Radio at 6:00am on 1 September 2020.

External links
 - now defunct, so redirects to successor website.

References

Radio stations in Dorset
Bauer Radio
Radio stations established in 1993
West Dorset District
Weymouth and Portland
Wessex
1993 establishments in England